Ricardo Sánchez Gálvez (born 12 January 1974) is a Mexican politician from the Institutional Revolutionary Party. From 2009 to 2012 he served as Deputy of the LXI Legislature of the Mexican Congress representing Michoacán.

References

1974 births
Living people
Politicians from Michoacán
Institutional Revolutionary Party politicians
People from Sahuayo
21st-century Mexican politicians
Deputies of the LXI Legislature of Mexico
Members of the Chamber of Deputies (Mexico) for Michoacán